Seyahatname is the name of a literary form and tradition whose examples can be found throughout centuries in the Middle Ages around the Islamic world, starting with the Arab travellers of the Umayyad period. In a more specific sense, the name refers to the travel notes by the Ottoman Turkish traveller Evliya Çelebi (1611–1682).

The Seyahâtnâme of Evliya Çelebi is an outstanding example of this tradition.

The author's personal name is Derviş Mehmed Zilli, and “Evliya” is his pen name, which he adopted in honor of his teacher, Evliya Mehmed Efendi. Evliya Çelebi's father was the chief jeweller to the courts, and thanks to the talent of his father Evliya was allowed to enjoy the favor of the court. Because of his gift in reciting the Quran, Evliya was presented to Sultan Murad IV and admitted to the palace, where he received extensive training in calligraphy, music, Arabic grammar, and tajwid. Shortly before Murad IV's expedition to Baghdad in 1638, Evliya was appointed a sipahi of the Porte.  Despite his diverse talents and the opportunity to climb the social ladder, Evliya had a keen interest in geography and invested his wealth into life goal of traveling.  He set out on a journey to assemble a complete description of the Ottoman Empire and its neighbors and to provide a complete record of his travels as a first-person narrative.

Volumes and content 
In his ten-volume Seyâhatnâme, Evliya describes: 

 Volume I: the capital city of Istanbul (his birthplace) and its surroundings 

 Volume II: Bursa, İzmir, Batum, Trabzon, Abkhazia, Crete, Erzurum, Azerbaijan, Georgia, 

 Volume III: Damascus, Syria, Palestine, Urmia, Sivas, Kurdistan, Armenia, Rumelia (Bulgaria and Dobruja) 
 Volume IV: Van, Tabriz, Baghdad, Basra

 Volume  V: Van, Basra, Hungary, Russia, Anatolia, Bursa, the Dardanelles, Adrianople, Moldavia, Transylvania, Bosnia, Dalmatia, Sofia

 Volume VI: Transylvania, Albania, Hungary, Nové Zámky, Belgrade, Herzegovina, Ragusa (Dubrovnik), Montenegro, Kanizsa, Croatia

 Volume VII: Hungary, Buda, Erlau, Temesvár, Transylvania, Wallachia, Moldavia, the Crimea, Kazak, South Russia, the Caucasus, Dagestan, Azak

 Volume VIII: Azak, Kafa, Bahçesaray (Crimea), Istanbul, Crete, Macedonia, Greece, Athens, the Dodecanese, Peloponnesus, Albania, Valona, Ochrida, Adrianople, Istanbul

 Volume IX: (Pilgrimage to Mecca) south-west Anatolia, Smyrna, Ephesus, Rhodes, south Anatolia, Syria, Aleppo, Damascus, Medina, Mecca, Suez

 Volume X: Egypt (with historical excursus), Cairo, Upper Egypt, Sudan, Abyssinia.

Features and limitations 
Evliya prefers legend to bare historical fact, and at times exaggerates or creates anecdotes designed for comic effect. His Seyâhatnâme thus appears as a work of 17th-century light literature, which was intelligible to a wide circle thanks to the mixed use of the colloquial Turkish of the 17th century with occasional borrowings of phrases and expressions from the ornate style. Such attempt to appeal to a wide audience may explain the author's lack of concern for historical truth. He even recorded certain occurrences as though he had seen or experienced them himself even though a close examination reveals that he knows of them only from hearsay or literary sources, which he does not cite.

In spite of these reservations, Evliya's Seyâhatnâme offers a wealth of information on cultural history, folklore, and geography. The significance of the work lies in the fact that it reflects the mental approach of the 17th century Ottoman Turkish intellectuals in their attitudes to the non-Muslim Occident, and sheds light on the administration and internal organization of the Ottoman empire of that time.

Because of the value of his work, the generic term of Seyâhatnâme is often used to refer to Evliya Çelebi's books in particular, as far as the Turkish language and studies are concerned.

Translations 
Aside from several translations into modern Turkish, substantial portions of Evliya's Seyâhatnâme have been translated into Arabic, Armenian, Bosnian, Greek, Hungarian, Romanian, Russian, and Serbian.  The most recent English translation is Robert Dankoff and Sooyong Kim's 2010 translation, An Ottoman Traveller: Selections from the Book of Travels of Evliya Çelebi, which includes sections from all volumes.

A related genre, specific to the journeys and experiences of Ottoman ambassadors, is the sefâretnâme (سفارت نامه), whose examples were edited by their authors with a view to their presentation to the Sultan and the high administration, thus also bearing a semi-official character, although they remained of interest for the general reader as well.

See also
 Piri Reis (and his Kitab-ı Bahriye)
 Turkish literature
 Evliya Çelebi Way

References

Sources

External links

 Seyahatname in Ottoman Language -  Contributor Robarts - University of Toronto

Turkish literature
Seyahatname
Persian words and phrases
17th-century books
Ottoman literature
 
Memory of the World Register